Souleymane Diawara (born 24 December 1978) is a Senegalese former professional footballer who played as a defender. He spent most of his career in France, playing for Le Havre, Sochaux, Bordeaux, Marseille and OGC Nice, apart from a brief stint at Charlton Athletic. At the international level, he represented Senegal.

Career
Diawara began his career at Havre AC, spending two seasons in Ligue 1 before the club was relegated. He stayed at Le Havre until 2003, before signing for FC Sochaux.

On 19 November 2002, he made his debut with the Senegalese national team against South Africa in a friendly match.

In 2006, he was transferred to Charlton Athletic. The following year he joined Bordeaux to strengthen the central defense with Marc Planus. Represented the national team at the 2006 Africa Cup of Nations, where his team took 4th place for the third time in history. Diawara was dropped from the Senegal squad in August 2006, ahead of their friendly with Ivory Coast, due to a breach of discipline.

In July 2009, he signed a four-year contract with Olympique de Marseille, with the transfer fee estimated at €7 million. On 8 August, he participated in his first game for his new club against Grenoble, which Marseille won 2–0.

On 23 April 2011, Marseille won the Coupe de la Ligue for the second consecutive year. Diawara thereby became the player holding the record for most Coupe de la Ligue trophies, having won his first with Sochaux in 2004, his second with Bordeaux and his third and fourth trophies with Marseille.

In September 2015, Diawara announced his retirement from professional football.

Honours
Sochaux
 Coupe de la Ligue: 2003–04

Bordeaux
 Ligue 1: 2008–09
 Coupe de la Ligue: 2008–09
 Trophée des Champions: 2008

Marseille
 Ligue 1: 2009–10
 Coupe de la Ligue: 2009–10, 2010–11
 Trophée des Champions: 2010, 2011

Senegal
Africa Cup of Nations four place:2006

Individual
Ligue 1 Team of the Year: 2008–09, 2009–10

References

1978 births
Living people
Association football defenders
Senegalese footballers
Senegalese expatriate footballers
Senegal international footballers
Olympique de Marseille players
FC Girondins de Bordeaux players
Charlton Athletic F.C. players
FC Sochaux-Montbéliard players
Le Havre AC players
OGC Nice players
Ligue 1 players
Ligue 2 players
Premier League players
Expatriate footballers in France
Expatriate footballers in England
Senegalese expatriate sportspeople in England
2004 African Cup of Nations players
2006 Africa Cup of Nations players
2008 Africa Cup of Nations players
2012 Africa Cup of Nations players